"Teo Torriatte (Let Us Cling Together)" (Japanese title:) is a song by Queen from their 1976 album A Day at the Races. Written by guitarist Brian May, it is the closing track on the album.

The song is notable for having two choruses sung entirely in Japanese, and it was released as a single exclusively in Japan, reaching #49 on the charts. (The B-side was "Good Old-Fashioned Lover Boy".) This song features a plastic piano and harmonium, both of which are played by May. They brought in a local choir to sing the chorus at the end. On the album, the song is crossfaded to a one-minute instrumental featuring a Shepard tone melody, which is actually a reprise of the beginning of the album.

Personnel
 Freddie Mercury – lead and backing vocals
 Brian May – harmonium, acoustic piano, Vox electronic piano, electric guitar, backing vocals
 Roger Taylor – drums, tambourine, percussion, backing vocals
 John Deacon – bass guitar

Live performances
It was performed live in Tokyo during the Jazz Tour in 1979 and again when the band visited Japan during The Game and Hot Space tours in 1981 and 1982, respectively. When Queen returned to Japan with Paul Rodgers in 2005, a truncated acoustic version was played during May's solo set. The same arrangement was used for Queen + Adam Lambert's festival appearances in Japan in summer 2014. Two years later, during the Japanese gigs of the Queen + Adam Lambert 2016 Summer Festival Tour, the song was played in its entirety featuring the full band.

Live recordings
 Super Live in Japan (2005)

In other media
"Teo Torriatte" was covered by Japanese singer Kokia on her 2008 Christmas album Christmas Gift, and by Mêlée in 2010 and can be found on the Japanese version of their album The Masquerade released in Japan on 18 August 2010. Andre Matos (former Angra singer) covered the song on the Japanese Edition of his 2010 effort Mentalize. Queen's version is also one of 38 songs included on the benefit album, Songs for Japan (compiled in response to the aftermath of the earthquake and tsunami in Tōhoku), released on 25 March 2011. An extract from the song was used as the musical accompaniment for a montage of the Olympic torch relay at the 2020 Summer Olympics opening ceremony ("Hope Lights Our Way") on 23 July 2021.

The song's alternative title is used on strategy video game Tactics Ogre: Let Us Cling Together.

Romanisation of the title
"Torriatte", such as on the back cover of the A Day at the Races album and their official website, is spelled with a double "r", which does not conform to romanisation systems in Japan. The Japanese single's cover gave the romanised version of the title as "Teo Toriatte", a standard single "r".

Chorus translation

The chorus part sung in Japanese goes as follows:

The chorus part sung in English:

The Japanese version is an approximate translation from the English original. The album liner notes includes a translation credit: "With special thanks to our Japanese friend and interpreter Chika Kujiraoka."

References

External links
 archived discography of A Day at the Races in Queen official website
 archived Lyrics

 Lyrics on Brian May's official website (archive.org) – Japanese part have several errors

Queen (band) songs
Macaronic songs
1976 songs
1977 singles
Rock ballads
Songs written by Brian May
Elektra Records singles
Hollywood Records singles